Critical mass is the amount of fissile material needed to sustain nuclear fission.

Critical mass may also refer to:

Science and technology
 Critical mass (sociodynamics), a stage in social-system innovation
 Critical mass (software engineering), a stage in the product life cycle of software

Organizations
 Critical Mass (cycling), a form of direct action involving large groups of bicycle riders
 Critical Mass (pressure group), a UK political pressure group
 Critical Mass Energy Project, an anti-nuclear umbrella group founded by Ralph Nader
 Critical Mass Journal, published in 1977 by the Critical Mass Energy Project
 Critical Mass, a co-working center sponsored by the New England Venture Capital Association
 Critical Mass, a robotics team of the Dwight-Englewood School in Englewood, New Jersey

Literature
 Critical Mass (book), a 2004 book by Philip Ball
 Critical Mass (2013 book), a 2013 novel by Sara Paretsky
 "Critical Mass" (Pohl and Kornbluth short story), a 1962 story by Frederik Pohl and Cyril M. Kornbluth
 "Critical Mass" (Arthur C. Clarke short story),  a 1949 short story by Arthur C. Clarke
 Critical Masses: Opposition to Nuclear Power in California, 1958–1978, a 1998 book by Thomas Wellock
 Critical Mass, a 1990 seven-issue comic book anthology printed under Epic Comics's Shadowline Saga imprint

Film and television 
 Critical Mass, a 1971 experimental short film from Hollis Frampton's Hapax Legomena cycle
 Critical Mass (anime), a subdivision of the video publisher and distributor Right Stuf Inc.
 Critical Mass (film), a 2000 film starring Treat Williams and Lori Loughlin
 "Critical Mass" (Stargate Atlantis), an episode of Stargate Atlantis

Gaming
 Duke Nukem: Critical Mass, a shooter game developed by Frontline Studios
 Critical Mass (1985 video game) or Power!, a computer game by Durell Software
 Critical Mass (1982 video game), an adventure game by Sirius Software
 Critical Mass, a set of collectible miniature game figures by HeroClix

Music

Bands
 Critical Mass (Canadian band), a Catholic rock band formed in 1997
 Critical Mass (Dutch band), a Dutch happy hardcore group

Albums and songs
 Critical Mass (Dave Holland album), 2006
 Critical Mass (Threshold album), 2002
 Critical Mass (Matthew Shipp album), 1995
 Critical Mass (Ra album), 2013
 "Critical Mass", a song by Aerosmith from Draw the Line
 "Critical Mass", a song by Nuclear Assault from Handle with Care
 "Critical Mass", a song by Chrome from Half Machine Lip Moves